The 16th National Film Awards, presented by Ministry of Information and Broadcasting, India to felicitate the best of Indian Cinema released in 1968. Ceremony took place at Vigyan Bhavan, New Delhi on 13 February 1970.

With 16th National Film Awards, three new awards were introduced, mainly for Best Film on Family Welfare, Best Child Artist and Best Film Lyric Writer. Moreover, for male and female singers, awards were differentiated with Best Male Playback Singer and Best Female Playback Singer respectively.

Juries 

Six different committees were formed based on the film making sectors in India, mainly based in Bombay, Calcutta and Madras along with the award categories. Another committee for all India level was also formed which included some of the members from regional committee. For 16th National Film Awards, central committee was headed by Justice G. D. Khosla.

 Jury Members: Central
 G. D. Khosla (Chairperson)Sitaram KesriSheila BhatiaA. C. JalanEzra MirB. K. KaranjiaTeji BachchanI. S. JoharHaridas BhattacharjeeU. Visweswar RaoSunder Lal NahataM. N. Kapur
 Jury Members: Documentary
 D. K. Borooah (Chairperson)Shambu MitraMrinalini SarabhaiG. G. SwellShanta Gandhi
 Jury Members: Short Films
 Piloo Mody (Chairperson)Balwant GargiAmita MalikR. G. AnandInder Lal Das
 Jury Regional: Bombay
 Nissim Ezekiel (Chairperson)Urmila KapurNavin KhandwallaR. S. PandeFiroze RangoonwallaBikram SinghBal ChhabdaShatrujit PaulBuny TalwarG. P. Shirke
 Jury Regional: Calcutta
 Amala Shankar (Chairperson)Roma ChoudhryChintamoni KarK. C. PanigrahiA. K. PramanickUtpal DuttaKanan DeviKartic ChatterjeeDurgadas Mitra
 Jury Regional: Madras
 C. R. Pattabhiraman (Chairperson)P. Achutha MenonR. K. NarayanMallikarjuna RaoSarojini VaradappanK. ManoharanRajammal AnantharamanV. C. SubburamanD. V. S. RajuB. Ananthaswami

Awards 

Awards were divided into feature films and non-feature films.

President's Gold Medal for the All India Best Feature Film is now better known as National Film Award for Best Feature Film, whereas President's Gold Medal for the Best Documentary Film is analogous to today's National Film Award for Best Non-Feature Film. For children's films, Prime Minister's Gold Medal is now given as National Film Award for Best Children's Film. At the regional level, President's Silver Medal for Best Feature Film is now given as National Film Award for Best Feature Film in a particular language. Certificate of Merit in all the categories is discontinued over the years.

Feature films 

Feature films were awarded at All India as well as regional level. For 16th National Film Awards, a Bengali film Goopy Gyne Bagha Byne won the President's Gold Medal for the All India Best Feature Film, with also winning the maximum number of awards (two); along with two Hindi films, Aashirwad and Saraswatichandra with a Malayalam film, Thulabharam and a Tamil film, Thillaanaa Mohanambal. Following were the awards given in each category:

All India Award 

Following were the awards given:

Regional Award 

The awards were given to the best films made in the regional languages of India. For feature films in Assamese, English, Gujarati, Kashmiri and Punjabi language, President's Silver Medal for Best Feature Film was not given. The producer and director of the film were awarded with 5,000 and a Silver medal, respectively.

Non-Feature films 

Following were the awards given:

Short films

Awards not given 

Following were the awards not given as no film was found to be suitable for the award:

 Best Story Writer
 Best Promotional Film
 President's Silver Medal for Best Feature Film in Assamese
 President's Silver Medal for Best Feature Film in English
 President's Silver Medal for Best Feature Film in Punjabi

References

External links 
 National Film Awards Archives
 Official Page for Directorate of Film Festivals, India

National Film Awards (India) ceremonies
1970 film awards
1970 in Indian cinema